John Grant Mitchell Jr. (June 17, 1874 – May 1, 1957) was an American actor. He appeared on Broadway from 1902 to 1939 and appeared in more than 125 films between 1930 and 1948.

Early years
Mitchell was born John Grant Mitchell Jr. on June 17, 1874, in Columbus, Ohio, the only son of American Civil War general John G. Mitchell. His paternal grandmother, Fanny Arabella Hayes, was the sister of President Rutherford B. Hayes. He attended Yale University, where he served as feature editor of campus humor magazine The Yale Record. 

Like his father, he became an attorney, graduating from the Harvard Law School. However, by his mid-to-late 20s, he tired of his legal practice and turned a long term dream into a reality by becoming an actor on Broadway. He played lead roles in plays such as It Pays to Advertise, The Whole Town's Talking, The Champion, and The Baby Cyclone.

Mitchell was a brother of the Delta Kappa Epsilon fraternity (Phi chapter).

Stage 
Mitchell's Broadway credits include Tide Rising (1936), All the King's Men (1928), One of the Family (1925), Spooks (1925), The Habitual Husband (1924), The Whole Town's Talking (1923), The School for Scandal (1923), Kempy (1921), The Hero (1920), The Champion (1920), and A Tailor-Made Man (1917).

Film 
In film, Mitchell initially made an appearance in 1916 and one or two other silents amidst his theater work, but Mitchell's screen career really took off with the advent of sound. His first starring role was in the film Man to Man (1930) from director Allan Dwan. Grant Michell often played the father of the heroine, businessmen, bank clerks or school principals. He usually played supporting characters, but also had a rare lead role in the B film comedy Father Is a Prince (1940).

He made many notable appearances in high-profile films such as Dinner At Eight (1933 David O. Selznick film), A Midsummer Night's Dream (1935, as Egeus), Mr. Smith Goes to Washington (1939, as a Washington senator), The Man Who Came to Dinner (1942, as the Stanley family's father), and Arsenic and Old Lace (1944, as Cary Grant's father-in-law Reverend Harper). He was also notable as Georges Clemenceau in the Oscar-winning film biography The Life of Emile Zola (1937). In John Ford's film classic The Grapes of Wrath (1940), based on John Steinbeck's book, Mitchell played the friendly caretaker of a migrant campground.

Personal life and death
Grant Mitchell retired from the film business in 1948 and died a bachelor on May 1, 1957. He was buried next to his father, mother, and stepmother at Green Lawn Cemetery  in Columbus, Ohio.

Complete filmography

The Misleading Lady (1916) as Stephen Weatherbee
Radio-Mania (1922) as Arthur Wyman
Man to Man (1930) as John Martin Bolton - Barber
The Star Witness (1931) as Pa Leeds
The Famous Ferguson Case (1932) as Martin Collins
Week-End Marriage (1932) as Doctor
Big City Blues (1932) as Station Agent
A Successful Calamity (1932) as Conners, Wilton's Butler
Three on a Match (1932) as Mr. Gilmore
If I Had a Million (1932) as Prison Priest (uncredited)
No Man of Her Own (1932) as Charlie Vane
20,000 Years in Sing Sing (1932) as Tester of Convicts' IQ (uncredited)
Our Betters (1933) as Thorton Clay
He Learned About Women (1933) as Appleby
Central Airport (1933) as Mr. Blaine
Lilly Turner (1933) as Dr. Hawley
Tomorrow at Seven (1933) as Austin Winters
Heroes for Sale (1933) as George Gibson
I Love That Man (1933) as Dr. Crittenden - Dentist
The Stranger's Return (1933) as Allen Redfield
Dinner at Eight (1933) as Ed Loomis
Wild Boys of the Road (1933) as Mr. James Smith
Saturday's Millions (1933) as Ezra Fowler
Dancing Lady (1933) as Jasper Bradley, Sr. 
 Shadows of Sing Sing (1933) as Joe Martel
King for a Night (1933) as Rev. John Williams
Convention City (1933) as J. B. Honeywell
The Poor Rich (1934) as Tom Hopkins
The Show-Off (1934) as Mr. "Pa"
Twenty Million Sweethearts (1934) as Chester A. Sharpe
We're Rich Again (1934) as Wilbur Page
The Cat's-Paw (1934) as Silk Hat McGee
One Exciting Adventure (1934) as Fussli
The Case of the Howling Dog (1934) as Claude Drumm
Gridiron Flash (1934) as Howard Smith
365 Nights in Hollywood (1934) as J. Walter Delmar
The Secret Bride (1934) as Willis Martin
One More Spring (1935) as Mr. Sheridan
Gold Diggers of 1935 (1935) as Louis Lamson
Straight from the Heart (1935) as Austin
Traveling Saleslady (1935) as Rufus Twitchell
Men Without Names (1935) as Andrew Webster
Broadway Gondolier (1935) as E. V. Richards, Radio Producer
Redheads on Parade (1935) (uncredited)
A Midsummer Night's Dream (1935) as Egeus
It's in the Air (1935) as W. R. Gridley
In Person (1935) as Judge Thaddeus Parks
Seven Keys to Baldpate (1935) as Thomas Hayden
The Garden Murder Case (1936) as Inspector Markham
Her Master's Voice (1936) as Horace J. Twilling
Next Time We Love (1936) as Michael Jennings
Moonlight Murder (1936) as Dr. Adams
The Ex-Mrs. Bradford (1936) as John Sumers
Parole! (1936) as Marty Crawford
My American Wife (1936) as Robert Cantillon
Piccadilly Jim (1936) as Herbert Pitt
The Devil Is a Sissy (1936) as Paul Krumpp
The Life of Emile Zola (1937) as Georges Clemenceau
Music for Madame (1937) as District Attorney Ernest Robinson
The Last Gangster (1937) as Warden
First Lady (1937) as Ellsworth T. Banning
Hollywood Hotel (1937) as B. L. Baulkin
Lady Behave! (1937) as Burton Williams
Women Are Like That (1938) as Mr. Snell
Reformatory (1938) as Arnold Frayne
Youth Takes a Fling (1938) as Duke
That Certain Age (1938) as Jeweler
The Headleys at Home (1938) as Ernest Headley
Peck's Bad Boy with the Circus (1938) as Henry Peck
Juarez (1939) as Mr. Harris (scenes deleted)
6,000 Enemies (1939) as Warden Parkhurst
Hell's Kitchen (1939) as Krispin
On Borrowed Time (1939) as Mr. Pilbeam
The Monroe Doctrine (1939, Short) as John Quincy Adams
Mr. Smith Goes to Washington (1939) as Senator MacPherson
The Secret of Dr. Kildare (1939) as John Xerxes Archley
The Grapes of Wrath (1940) as Caretaker of trailer park
Castle on the Hudson (1940) as Dr. Ames (uncredited)
It All Came True (1940) as Mr. Rene Salmon
Edison, the Man (1940) as Snade
New Moon (1940) as Governor of New Orleans
My Love Came Back (1940) as Dr. Knobbe
We Who Are Young (1940) as Jones
The Bride Wore Crutches (1941) as E.J. Randall
Father Is a Prince (1940) as John Bower
Tobacco Road (1941) as George Payne
Footsteps in the Dark (1941) as Wellington Carruthers
The Penalty (1941) as Judge
The Great Lie (1941) as Joshua Mason
The Feminine Touch (1941) as Dean Hutchinson
One Foot in Heaven (1941) as Clayton Potter
Nothing But the Truth (1941) as Mr. Bishop
Skylark (1941) as Frederick Vantine
The Man Who Came to Dinner (1942) as Ernest W. Stanley
Larceny, Inc. (1942) as Mr. Aspinwall
Meet the Stewarts (1942) as Mr. Pierce Goodwin
The Gay Sisters (1942) as Gilbert Wheeler
Cairo (1942) as O.H.P. Boggs
Orchestra Wives (1942) as Dr. Ward
My Sister Eileen (1942) as Walter Sherwood
The Amazing Mrs. Holliday (1943) as Edgar Holiday
All by Myself (1943) as J.D. Gibbons
Dixie (1943) as Mr. Mason
See Here, Private Hargrove (1944) as Uncle George
Step Lively (1944) as Dr. Gibbs
Arsenic and Old Lace (1944) as Reverend Harper
The Impatient Years (1944) as Hotel Clerk
Laura (1944) (scenes cut)
When the Lights Go On Again (1944) as Mr. Arnold Benson
And Now Tomorrow (1944) as Uncle Wallace
Bring on the Girls (1945) as Uncle Ralph
Crime, Inc. (1945) as Wayne Clark
A Medal for Benny (1945) as Mayor of Pantera
Wonder Man (1945) as Mr. Wagonseller (uncredited)
Bedside Manner (1945) as Mr. Pope
Conflict (1945) as Dr. Grant
Guest Wife (1945) as House Detective
Leave Her to Heaven (1945) as Carlson (uncredited)
Colonel Effingham's Raid (1946) as Maj. Anthony T. Hickock (uncredited)
Cinderella Jones (1946) (scenes deleted)
Easy to Wed (1946) as Homer Henshaw
It Happened on 5th Avenue (1947) as Farrow
Blondie's Holiday (1947) as Samuel Breckenridge
Honeymoon (1947) as Congressman Crenshaw
The Corpse Came C.O.D. (1947) as Mitchell Edwards
Blondie's Anniversary (1947) as Samuel Breckenridge
Who Killed Doc Robbin (1948) as Judge (final film role)

References

Bibliography

External links
 

1874 births
1957 deaths
20th-century American male actors
American male film actors
American male stage actors
Mitchell, Grant
Harvard Law School alumni
Male actors from Columbus, Ohio
Rutherford B. Hayes
The Yale Record alumni